Eirin Faldet (born 5 January 1944 in Oslo) is a Norwegian politician for the Labour Party. She was elected to the Norwegian Parliament from Hedmark in 1985, and has been re-elected on five occasions. She has served as Deputy President of the Storting since 2001. On the local level she was a member of Trysil municipal council from 1975 to 1978. Prior to entering politics she was a teacher and a social worker.

References

1944 births
Living people
Members of the Storting
Hedmark politicians
Labour Party (Norway) politicians
Women members of the Storting
21st-century Norwegian politicians
21st-century Norwegian women politicians
20th-century Norwegian politicians
20th-century Norwegian women politicians